Indian Lake is a lake in Schoolcraft County, Michigan, United States. Measuring six miles long and three miles wide, and covering , it is the fourth largest inland lake on Michigan's Upper Peninsula. Indian Lake is bordered by the two units of Indian Lake State Park on its south and west shores and by Palms Book State Park on its northwest shore.

See also
List of lakes in Michigan

References

Lakes of Michigan
Lakes of Schoolcraft County, Michigan